Atlantic is a city in and the county seat of Cass County, Iowa, United States, located along the East Nishnabotna River. The population was 6,792 in the 2020 census, a decline from the 7,257 population in 2000.

History

Atlantic was founded in October 1868 by Franklin H. Whitney, B.F. Allen, John P. Cook, and others. While historians cannot agree on how Atlantic got its name, local legend tells that the founding fathers estimated that the town was about halfway between the Pacific Ocean and the Atlantic Ocean, so it led them to flip a coin and, clearly, Atlantic won. The nearby Rock Island Railroad was important in deciding the actual location of the town, and to this day, the old depot sits at the north end of Chestnut Street. Today, the depot serves as the offices of the Chamber of Commerce.

A log cabin stands in Atlantic City Park with a historical plaque bearing the following inscription:

Another story told about Atlantic is the way the main street was located. Someone asked Whitney where it should be placed.

Since 1929, Atlantic is noted for the Atlantic Coca-Cola Bottling Company, which bottles and distributes drinks from The Coca-Cola Company to Iowa and parts of Minnesota, Wisconsin, Illinois, and Missouri.

Atlantic has one high school, The Atlantic High School, home of the Atlantic Trojans.

Geography 
Atlantic's longitude and latitude coordinates in decimal form are 41.401404, -95.010867.

Climate

According to the Köppen Climate Classification system, Atlantic has a hot-summer humid continental climate, abbreviated "Dfa" on climate maps.

Demographics

2010 census
At the 2010 census there were 7,112 people, 3,137 households, and 1,906 families living in the city. The racial makup of the city was 97.0% White, 0.2% African American, 0.3% Native American, 0.3% Asian, 0.5% Pacific Islander, 1.0% from other races, and 0.6% from two or more races. Hispanic or Latino of any race were 2.6%.

Of the 3,137 households, 26.8% had children under the age of 18 living with them, 47.0% were married couples living together, 9.9% had a female householder with no husband present, 3.9% had a male householder with no wife present, and 39.2% were non-families. 34.3% of households were one person and 15.7% were one person aged 65 or older. The average household size was 2.21 and the average family size was 2.80.

The median age was 44.3 years. 22.6% of residents were under the age of 18; 7.1% were between the ages of 18 and 24; 20.9% were from 25 to 44; 27.1% were from 45 to 64; and 22% were 65 or older. The gender makeup of the city was 47.9% male and 52.1% female.

2000 census
At the 2000 census there were 7,257 people, 3,126 households, and 1,969 families living in the city. The racial makup of the city was 98.65% White, 0.25% African American, 0.12% Native American, 0.22% Asian, 0.06% Pacific Islander, 0.41% from other races, and 0.29% from two or more races. Hispanic or Latino of any race were 0.79%.

Of the 3,126 households, 28.5% had children under the age of 18 living with them, 51.0% were married couples living together, 8.8% had a female householder with no husband present, and 37.0% were non-families. 33.7% of households were one person and 18.0% were one person aged 65 or older. The average household size was 2.22 and the average family size was 2.81.

Age spread: 23.0% under the age of 18, 7.4% from 18 to 24, 24.3% from 25 to 44, 22.3% from 45 to 64, and 23.0% 65 or older. The median age was 42 years. For every 100 females, there were 89.3 males. For every 100 females age 18 and over, there were 83.5 males.

The median household income was $33,370 and the median family income was $41,168. Males had a median income of $30,691 versus $20,271 for females. The per capita income for the city was $17,832. About 6.3% of families and 12.1% of the population were below the poverty line, including 17.5% of those under age 18 and 10.6% of those age 65 or over.

Education
It is within the Atlantic Community School District. Atlantic High School is the local school district.

Media 
Newspaper
Atlantic, Iowa is one of the smallest communities in Iowa to have a daily newspaper, the Atlantic News-Telegraph. The editor E.P. Chase of the newspaper was awarded the 1934 Pulitzer Prize for Editorial Writing. 
Radio
Atlantic is home to three radio stations. KSOM 96.5 FM is a 100,000 watt station that reaches more than 22 counties with studios in Atlantic. KSOM features award-winning local news at the top of the hour as well as Bill O'Reilly news and commentary daily and 12 locally originated ag reports each weekday.   KSOM broadcasts Iowa State Sports, NASCAR and award-winning high school sports coverage.

KS 95.7 offers classic rock music and is the home and away voice of the Atlantic High School Trojans.  Many of the Atlantic High school sporting events are also live video streamed by KS 95.7.

Meredith Communications is the owner of KSOM and KS 95.7 and is also the publisher of the website westerniowatoday.com and a daily electronic newspaper called The Daily.
KJAN 1220 AM which features a variety music format and is licensed to Wireless Communications Corp.. KJAN also broadcasts on FM translator 101.1. KJAN AM 1220/FM 101.1 features local news, sports, weather, farm and information 24 hours a day. Listen to Iowa Hawkeye football and basketball, St. Louis Cardinals baseball and Kansas City Chiefs football on KJAN.

Transportation

Railroads
Atlantic is served by the Iowa Interstate Railroad, a successor to the Chicago, Rock Island and Pacific Railroad. Until 1970 the Rock Island Railroad Atlantic depot served a daily Council Bluffs - Chicago train.  The railroad has one daily job, a local known as “The Rover”, that starts and ends its shift in Atlantic. From Atlantic service is provided to customers between Hancock and Des Moines. The town also sees two daily through freights. Daily Amtrak service is in Omaha, 58 miles to the west and Creston, 58 miles to the southeast.

Buses
Atlantic is served by daily intercity buses from Burlington Trailways. While the stop, located at 64975 Boston Rd, is named Atlantic, it is actually located over 6 miles from town, off Interstate 80.

Notable people

Don A. Allen, member of California State Assembly and of Los Angeles City Council in 1940s and 1950s, born in Atlantic
Harlan J. Bushfield (1882–1948), Republican U.S. senator and 16th governor of South Dakota
Blake Curd (born 1967), Physician and South Dakota state legislator
Jack Drake (1934–2015), longtime state representative in Iowa, born and died in Atlantic
William G. Cambridge, United States federal court judge
Steve H. Hanke, professor of economics, adviser to presidents, currency reformer and commodity and currency trader
Frederick C. Loofbourow (1874–1949), Republican U.S. representative from Utah
Shannon McCormick (born 1971), actor and voice actor
Ethel T. Wead Mick (1881–1957), founder of Masonic girls' organization now known as Job's Daughters
Ed Podolak (born 1947), professional football player and color commentator for Iowa Hawkeyes football games on WHO radio
William Appleman Williams (1921–1990), president of Organization of American Historians
Lafayette Young (1848–1926), Republican senator from Iowa, state senator, newspaper reporter, editor and owner
Glen R. Smith Chairman and CEO, Farm Credit Administration (2019-2022), farmer, businessman

See also

T-Bone Trail

References

External links 

Official Atlantic City Website
Chamber of Commerce
Atlantic News Telegraph Local daily newspaper website
Atlantic Police Department

 
Cities in Cass County, Iowa
Cities in Iowa
County seats in Iowa
Populated places established in 1868
1868 establishments in Iowa